The Panda Cup International Youth Football Tournament (Chinese: 熊猫杯国际青年足球邀请赛) is an annual international youth football tournament that is held in the city of Chengdu, China.

The tournament was first announced in April 2014.

The original logo was designed by a Los Angeles-based Chinese student; it was inspired by a Chinese dragon, a giant panda and the Olympic rings.

Originally an under-19 event, the tournament format began as a single round league format. Prior to the 2019 event tournament the Chinese Football Association announced the intention to expand the format in future years to include more teams or multiple age groups. An international youth football development seminar and other events run in conjunction with the Panda Cup.

Previous Tournaments

References 

Under-19 association football competitions
Youth association football competitions for international teams
International association football competitions hosted by China
Recurring sporting events established in 2014